Forbes Corporate Warrior is a 3D first-person shooter thinly guised as an investment game. The game was released in August 1997 by Byron Preiss Multimedia and developed by Brooklyn Multimedia. It was developed to operate on the Windows 95 platform.

Corporate Warrior was hailed by Crain's New York Business Magazine as, "Doom meets Wharton School of Business."

External links
 

1997 video games
Video games developed in the United States
Windows games
Windows-only games